New Candys is an Italian alternative rock band formed in Venice in 2008. Led by songwriter, singer and guitarist Fernando Nuti, they started as a four-piece with drummer Dario Lucchesi as the only other permanent member throughout the band's career. New Candys' live lineup has changed over the years, with Nuti remaining the only consistent member. The current incarnation of the band includes Emanuele Zanardo (lead guitar, backing vocals), Marco Contestabile (bass guitar) and Francesco Giacomin (drums, percussion, sampler).

History

Formation and Stars Reach The Abyss (2008–2014)
The band was formed in 2008 by Fernando Nuti (lead vocals, guitar), Diego Menegaldo (lead guitar, backing vocals), Stefano Bidoggia (bass guitar) and Dario Lucchesi (drums, percussion).

In the following two years, the band played live around the Venice area until the release of their first self-produced EP on July 7, 2010. Welcomed by the Italian press, they began to play shows throughout Northern Italy. On 23 March 2012 their first studio album Stars Reach The Abyss was released through Foolica (repressed by Fuzz Club in 2017). The album was produced by Pierluigi Ballarin and Stefano Moretti and mastered by Jon Astley. The release brought the band on tour in England and Italy supporting artists such as Jon Spencer Blues Explosion, Dead Skeletons and Crystal Stilts. The song "Meltdown Corp." was included in the double LP The Reverb Conspiracy Vol. 3, an annual compilation that brings together the best young European bands of the underground psych scene, co-released by Fuzz Club and The Reverberation Appreciation Society (Levitation Austin).

New Candys As Medicine (2015–2016)
Their second studio album, New Candys As Medicine, was released on 16 March 2015 in the United States through the record label Picture In My Ear and through Fuzz Club in Europe. The release was preceded by a 10” split single with the band Kill Your Boyfriend featuring the single "Dark Love" and exclusive track "Surf 2". The album, mixed by John Wills (producer and drummer of Loop), was distributed by The Committee To Keep Music Evil too, a label founded and ran by The Brian Jonestown Massacre. New Candys As Medicine received praise from Simone Marie Butler of Primal Scream, Stephen Lawrie of The Telescopes and Orange Amplification.

In the next two years the band toured Europe three times playing in Switzerland, Germany, Czech Republic, Austria, Belgium, England, Scotland, France, Netherlands, Sweden, Denmark, Slovenia, Spain and Croatia. They performed at the Secret Garden Party 2015, Liverpool International Festival Of Psychedelia 2016, Barcelona Psych Fest 2017, and supported bands including Slowdive, The Vaccines and Savages.

Bleeding Magenta (2017–2020)
New Candys’ third album Bleeding Magenta was released on 8 October 2017 by Fuzz Club and repressed by Little Cloud Records in the United States. Recorded by Andrea Volpato and produced by the band, it received critical acclaim from the press including the music webzines Clash and Drowned in Sound. Two songs from the album, and one from a previous record, were featured on three episodes of Showtime Networks original TV series Shameless.

Andrea Volpato joined the band since the European promotional tour of the album, which included the performance at SpaceFest 2017 in Poland. In 2018 they toured Australia playing 14 shows, headlining both Sydney and Melbourne Psych Fest and performing at the Adelaide Fringe Festival. Next the band went on a US-Mexico tour of 18 shows plus a KEXP live session in Seattle. The American tour started with two shows in New York and proceeded along the west coast, including performances at Pappy & Harriet's in Pioneertown and the Highland Park Bowl in Los Angeles.

Stefano Bidoggia left the band before the Australian tour and Diego Menegaldo after the North American tour. In June 2018 Alessandro Boschiero joined the band on bass. Later in the summer they performed at Fuzz Club Eindhoven, headlined by The Black Angels, and supported The Brian Jonestown Massacre for both of their Italian shows. In 2019 they completed a back to back tour of 50 shows in Europe, the US and Canada including Desert Stars Festival in Joshua Tree, Milwaukee Psych Fest, The Echo in Los Angeles, Hotel Vegas in Austin and Mercury Lounge in New York. A third European tour took place in September, including Levitation France and shows with The Warlocks and The Dandy Warhols. In January 2020 they played the Balkans for the first time, with shows in Greece, Bulgaria, North Macedonia, Romania, Serbia and Croatia.

Vyvyd (2021–present)
New Candys’ fourth and latest album Vyvyd was released on 4 June 2021 via Little Cloud Records and Dischi Sotterranei, plus an exclusive vinyl edition on Fuzz Club. The record was recorded and mixed at Fox Studio in Venice by Andrea Volpato with additional mixing by Grammy Award producer Tommaso Colliva, who worked with Muse, The Jesus and Mary Chain and Damon Albarn among others.

On 16 March 2021 New Candys released the first lead single "Twin Mime" with a music video which premiered on Post-Punk.com. This was followed by the second single "Begin Again" on 13 April 2021; the music video, directed by Ivana Smudja, premiered on CVLT Nation and the song was featured on the "Sacred Bones Now Playing" playlist curated by the renowned record label. The third and final single "Zyko" was released on 11 May 2021, the song was broadcast on BBC Radio 6 Music during Iggy Pop’s Iggy Confidential hosted by Tom Robinson and on 14 May the band performed for the online edition of The Great Escape Festival.

Vyvyd was released on 4 June 2021 accompanied by two music visualizers for "Factice" and “Evil Evil” and an interview for Beat Magazine. Under the Radar 's Haydon Spenceley wrote that the album "takes the best of psych and shoegaze, adds an effective strain of driving originality and songwriting chops, and dresses it up in a satisfying intensity." KEXPs Music Director Don Yates declared Vyvyd to be “a solid set of shoegazer psych-rock with fuzzy guitars, atmospheric synths, heavy rhythms, detached vocals and hypnotic song hooks” whilst DJ John Richards said fans of Black Rebel Motorcycle Club, Ride or The Jesus and Mary Chain will love the album. Record producer Gordon Raphael defined the song 'Begin Again' as "incredibly good" and in February 2022 'Zyko' was broadcast again on BBC Radio 6 Music during Iggy Confidential, this time hosted by Iggy Pop who described the band as "kinky".

Between winter 2021 and summer 2022 the group was engaged in an intense live activity. The first dates in Europe included Croc' The Rock Festival in Lausanne in Switzerland and Synästhesie Festival in Berlin, followed by a tour in the UK and France. Between March and May 2022 they completed two North American tours of 19 and 13 dates respectively, including concerts at the Zebulon in Los Angeles, Mississippi Studios in Portland and played festivals such as the Freakout Weekender in Seattle, Treefort Music Fest in Boise and SXSW in Austin where they also recorded a session for Jam in the Van, subsequently released digitally.
In June 2022 they played in Europe and England in support of The Dandy Warhols. The tour included historical venues such as the Olympia Hall in Paris and The Roundhouse in London. Anton Newcombe, frontman of The Brian Jonestown Massacre, after attending the concert in Berlin expressed words of appreciation for the band. The tour was preceded by the digital release of "Zyko" remixed by Peter Holmström, guitarist of The Dandy Warhols.
On July 16th the band performed for the first time in Lithuania at the Devilstone Fest. In August they toured the US again playing mainly the South Central states, culminating in the festival Psycho Las Vegas.
In the next and last tour of 2022 they performed in Germany, France, Spain and for the first time in Portugal. Alessandro Boschiero and Andrea Volpato parted ways from the band in October 2022. On 6 November 2022 'Evil Evil' was broadcast by Iggy Pop during his show for BBC Radio 6 Music.
On 5 January 2023 they announced 21 shows in Europe, including 7 shows in support of The Black Angels. Emanuele Zanardo, Marco Contestabile and Francesco Giacomin joined the band subsequently.

Band Members
Fernando Nuti - lead vocals, guitar, sitar, synthesizer (2008–present)
Dario Lucchesi - drums, percussion, sampler, synthesizer (2008–present)Additional touring line-upEmanuele Zanardo - lead guitar, backing vocals (2023-present)
Marco Contestabile - bass (2023–present)
Francesco Giacomin - drums, percussion, sampler (2023–present)Former membersDiego Menegaldo - lead guitar, backing vocals (2008–2018)
Stefano Bidoggia - bass (2008–2018)
Andrea Volpato - lead guitar, backing vocals (2017–2022)
Alessandro Boschiero - bass (2018–2022)Former touring musiciansBlair Wittstadt - bass (Australia Tour 2018)
Marco Fabris - drums, percussion (Australia Tour 2018)
Andrea Davì - drums, percussion, sampler (Europe Tour September 2022)

Timeline

 Discography Studio Albums 2012 - Stars Reach The Abyss (Foolica; 2017, Fuzz Club)
 2015 - New Candys As Medicine (Picture In My Ear, Fuzz Club)
 2017 - Bleeding Magenta (Fuzz Club; 2018, Little Cloud Records)
 2021 - Vyvyd (Little Cloud Records, Dischi Sotterranei, Fuzz Club)EPs 2010 - New Candys (self-produced)Singles 2022 - Zyko (The Dandy Warhols Remix) (self-produced)Compilations 2015 - New Candys / Kill Your Boyfriend (Shyrec, Xnot You Xme)
 2015 - The Reverb Conspiracy Vol. 3 (Fuzz Club, The Reverberation Appreciation Society)
 2016 - Volumes (Picture In My Ear)Soundtracks'''
 2013 - Delirium: A Trip Of Madness (movie by Pablo Aguiar)
 2015 - Magasin (short film by Jordy Tempelman)
 2016 - Shameless, episode 10.7 "Ride or die" (television series by Paul Abbott)
 2017 - Shameless, episode 4.8 "Fuck Paying It Forward" (television series by Paul Abbott)
 2017 - Shameless, episode 6.8 "Icarus Fell And Rusty Ate Him" (television series by Paul Abbott)
 2018 - GoPro: Valentino Rossi - Origins - Tavullia & MotoGP™ (YouTube video)
 2021 - Made in Chelsea'', episode 11.22 (British structured-reality television series broadcast by E4)

References

External links
New Candys official website

Italian rock music groups